Dhaddi jatha or dhadd jatha is a type of musical tercet or quartet from Punjab, India, which consists of one or two vocalists/dhadd drum players and one or two sarangi players. The vocalists sing independently or in unison the letter of the song. 
The range of the topics covers Sikh devotional compositions, valiant chats,  romance stories, history and various types of folk songs.  Dhadd drum is played by beating with fingers on one side. The pitch of the drum is raised by tightening a band wrapped around the waist of the drum.

References

Indian musicians
Musical quartets
Punjabi music